Marie Quillan (March 17, 1909 – April 16, 1998) was an American actress who was active in Hollywood during the 1920s and 1930s. She was known primarily for her work on B-movie Westerns.

Biography 
Quillan was born in Philadelphia, Pennsylvania, to Sarah Owens and Joseph Quillan, both of whom were performers born in Scotland.

By the late 1920s, the Quillan family had resettled in Los Angeles, where she and several of her brothers and sisters performed with in vaudeville shows. Quillan's first known film credit was 1929's Noisy Neighbors.

Little is known of her life after her appearance in 1935's The Singing Vagabond.

Selected filmography 
 Noisy Neighbors (1929)
 Campus Knights (1929)
 The Cheyenne Cyclone (1931)
 The Hurricane Horseman (1931)
 The Saddle Buster (1932)
The Singing Vagabond (1935)
 Melody Trail (1935)
 Alias Mary Dow (1935)

References 

American actresses
Actresses from Pennsylvania
1909 births
1998 deaths
Actresses from Philadelphia
20th-century American women